Tyra Grant (born August 27, 1988) is a former professional basketball player. She was drafted by the Phoenix Mercury in the 2010 WNBA Draft.

College career
Grant earned AP Honorable Mention All-American honors in 2010, her senior year at Penn State.

College statistics

Source

References

External links
Penn State Lady Lions bio

1988 births
Living people
American expatriate basketball people in Finland
American women's basketball players
Basketball players from Youngstown, Ohio
Guards (basketball)
Penn State Lady Lions basketball players
Phoenix Mercury draft picks